Faith, Hope and Fury is the third studio album by Polish trip hop singer Pati Yang. The album was released by EMI Music Poland on 24 April 2009.

Track listing

Pati Yang albums
2009 albums